

62001–62100 

|-id=071
| 62071 Voegtli ||  || Christian Voegtli (born 1959), also spelt Vögtli, is a Swiss physicist who studied theoretical physics in Basel. For many years he has been interested in evolutionary processes and he is very happy now to watch his two funny daughters developing their fitness for the next generation. || 
|}

62101–62200 

|-id=190
| 62190 Augusthorch ||  || August Horch (1868–1951), German engineer and automobile pioneer. The first Horch automobile was built in 1901. || 
|}

62201–62300 

|-bgcolor=#f2f2f2
| colspan=4 align=center | 
|}

62301–62400 

|-bgcolor=#f2f2f2
| colspan=4 align=center | 
|}

62401–62500 

|-bgcolor=#f2f2f2
| colspan=4 align=center | 
|}

62501–62600 

|-id=503
| 62503 Tomcave ||  || Thomas Roland Cave III (1923–2003) was an American amateur astronomer and persistent observer with a special interest in Mars. His planetary observations covered more than half a century. He shared his observatory in California willingly and helped numerous astronomy enthusiasts in the building of their own telescopes (Src). || 
|}

62601–62700 

|-id=666
| 62666 Rainawessen || 2000 TA || Raina Wessen (born 1994) has been the Key Club Treasurer and Associated Student Body Treasurer at Marshall Fundamental High School. She has held positions in her community for NASA's Jet Propulsion Laboratory, the Huntington Memorial Hospital and the Pasadena Humane Society. || 
|}

62701–62800 

|-
| 62701 Davidrankin ||  || David Rankin (born 1984) is an American amateur astronomer and observer of near-Earth objects, who reports his follow-up observations to the MPC. || 
|-id=794
| 62794 Scheirich ||  || Petr Scheirich (born 1979), a Czech astronomer at the Ondřejov Observatory, who is an expert in the modeling of binary and tumbling asteroids from photometric observations. He also engages in meteorite field searches. || 
|}

62801–62900 

|-bgcolor=#f2f2f2
| colspan=4 align=center | 
|}

62901–63000 

|-bgcolor=#f2f2f2
| colspan=4 align=center | 
|}

References 

062001-063000